Coral Seymour Memorial Ballpark is a 1,300-seat baseball park in Kenai in the U.S. state of Alaska. It is home to the Peninsula Oilers of the Alaska Baseball League. It was constructed in 1976, and remodeled in 1998. It was formerly known as Oiler Park before being renamed in honor of Coral Seymour, a vital figure in the early history of the Oilers. It is surrounded by spruce trees. It has a natural grass playing field.

In a rarity to baseball stadiums, it contains heat fans in the ceiling of the grandstand.

References

1976 establishments in Alaska
Alaska Baseball League
Baseball venues in Alaska
Buildings and structures in Kenai Peninsula Borough, Alaska
Sports venues completed in 1976
Tourist attractions in Kenai Peninsula Borough, Alaska